Tha or THA may refer to:

 Temporary Housing Area
 Tetrahydroaminoacridine or Tacrine
Texas Heartbeat Act
 Tha language, an Adamawa language of Nigeria
 Tha (Javanese) (ꦛ), a syllable
 Ṭha (Indic) a letter of Indic abugidas
 Tha (film), India
 Tha, a track by Aphex Twin on Selected Ambient Works 85–92
 THA, the IATA code for Tullahoma Regional Airport in the state of Tennessee, US
 THA, the ICAO code for Thai Airways International
 tha, the ISO 639-3 code for the Thai language
 THA, the National Rail code for Thatcham railway station in the county of Berkshire, UK
 Tobago House of Assembly, legislative body
 Total hip arthroplasty or hip replacement
 Transvaal Horse Artillery

See also